In the context of the C or C++ programming languages, a library is called header-only if the full definitions of all macros, functions and classes comprising the library are visible to the compiler in a header file form. Header-only libraries do not need to be separately compiled, packaged and installed in order to be used. All that is required is to point the compiler at the location of the headers, and then  the header files into the application source. Another advantage is that the compiler's optimizer can do a much better job when all the library's source code is available.

The disadvantages include:
 brittleness – most changes to the library will require recompilation of all compilation units using that library
 longer compilation times – the compilation unit must see the implementation of all components in the included files, rather than just their interfaces
 machine-code bloat (arguably) – the necessary use of inline statements in non-class functions can lead to code bloat by over-inlining.

Nonetheless, the header-only form is popular because it avoids the (often much more serious) problem of packaging.

For C++ templates, including the definitions in header is the only way to compile, since the compiler needs to know the full definition of the templates in order to instantiate.

References

C++
Only
C (programming language) libraries